Friedrich Wilhelm Adolph Marr (November 16, 1819 – July 17, 1904) was a German agitator and journalist, who popularized the term "antisemitism" (1881).

Life
Marr was born in Magdeburg as the only son of an actor and stage director. He went to a primary school in Hanover, then to a high school in Braunschweig. In Hamburg and Bremen, he was an apprentice in commerce, then he joined his father in Vienna, who had been engaged by the Burgtheater. There he worked as an employee in two Jewish firms. Later, Marr claimed that he had unjustly lost his job.

In 1841, he went to Zürich, where he became acquainted with political émigrés (like Georg Herwegh, Julius Fröbel, and August Follen), most of whom were members of the democratic or liberal leftist movements of the early 19th century.

In 1843, Marr was expelled from Zürich under the accusation that he had furthered communist activities. He turned to Lausanne, where he joined Hermann Döleke and Julius Standau, the founders of the secret Léman-Bund, which belonged to the "Junges Deutschland" (Young German Movement). Marr eventually became the head of the secret society and began to lean towards anarchism and atheism, founded another secret society, the "Schweizerischer Arbeiterbund" (Swiss Worker's Union) and edited the "Blätter der Gegenwart für soziales Leben" (Present-Day Papers for Social Life, 1844/45). In 1845 he was expelled from Lausanne, too, and went to Hamburg. There he became a political journalist and published the satirical magazine Mephistopheles (1847/48–1852). He belonged to the leftists of the radical-democratic "party" and was a delegate to the National Assembly in Frankfurt after the March-Revolution of 1848. After the ultimate failure of the revolution he became, like so many other former revolutionaries, a proponent of the idea of German unification under Prussian leadership.

In 1852, Marr went abroad, to Costa Rica, where he tried to make a living as a businessman. Lacking success, he returned to Hamburg, worked again as a journalist, and in 1854 he married Georgine Johanna Bertha Callenbach, daughter of a Jewish businessman who had renounced his faith.

In 1859, Marr was elected member of the Hamburg Parliament. In an article, in the Courier an der Weser on 13 June 1862, he attacked the elected liberal speaker of the house, the Jewish lawyer , accusing him and other Jews of betraying the democratic movement and abusing their emancipation in order to enter the city's merchant class. After extensive public protests, Marr was not reelected in 1862.

Marr and his first wife were divorced in 1873. In 1874, Marr married the Jewish Helene Sophia Emma Maria Behrend, who died within the same year. Marr's first marriage was an unhappy one, and despite being financially stable, Marr was in emotional distress. Marr's second marriage was a happy one, but then his wife and child died within days of each other, which left Marr in great distress and bitter towards the world. In 1875, there was a third marriage, to Jenny Therese Kornick (whose parents lived in a Christian-Jewish mixed marriage), who bore him a son. In 1877, this marriage was ended in divorce too; Marr's last wife was Clara Maria Kelch, daughter of a Hamburg working man.

Marr's speeches and articles showed first indications of antisemitism in 1848. He was influenced by the Burschenschaft movement of the early nineteenth century, which developed out of frustration among German students with the failure of the Congress of Vienna to create a unified state out of all the territories inhabited by the German people. The latter rejected the participation of Jewish and other non-German minorities as members, "unless they prove that they are anxious to develop within themselves a Christian-German spirit" (a decision of the "Burschenschaft Congress of 1818"). While they were opposed to the participation of Jews in their movement, similarly to Heinrich von Treitschke later, they did allow the possibility of the Jewish (and other) minorities to participate in the German state if they were to abandon all signs of ethnic and religious distinctiveness and assimilate into the German Volk.

Theories

Marr took these philosophies one step further by rejecting the premise of assimilation as a means for Jews to become Germans. In his pamphlet Der Weg zum Siege des Germanenthums über das Judenthum (The Way to Victory of Germanism over Judaism, 1879) he introduced the idea that Germans and Jews were locked in a longstanding conflict, the origins of which he attributed to race—and that the Jews were winning. He argued that Jewish emancipation resulting from German liberalism had allowed the Jews to control German finance and industry. Furthermore, since this conflict was based on the different qualities of the Jewish and German races, it could not be resolved even by the total assimilation of the Jewish population. According to him, the struggle between Jews and Germans would only be resolved by the victory of one and the ultimate death of the other. A Jewish victory, he concluded, would result in finis Germaniae (the end of the German people). To prevent this from happening, in 1879 Marr founded the League of Antisemites (Antisemiten-Liga), the first German organization committed specifically to combating the alleged threat to Germany posed by the Jews and advocating their forced removal from the country.

Although he had introduced the pseudo-scientific racial component into the debate over Jews in Germany, it is unlikely that he was influenced by the earlier theories of Arthur de Gobineau (author of An Essay on the Inequality of Human Races, 1853), who was only translated into German in 1898, a quarter of a century after Marr's pamphlet appeared. It is, however, highly probable that Marr was able to read Gobineau in French. Furthermore, Marr himself was very vague about what constituted race and, in turn, the racial differences between Jews and Germans, though this became a feature of Nazi racial "science". It remained for later racial thinkers to postulate specific differences: these included Eugen Dühring, who suggested that it was blood, and Houston Stewart Chamberlain, an influential race theorist and husband of Eva Wagner, Richard Wagner's daughter, who suggested phrenology as a means of distinguishing races.

On the other hand, it does seem likely that Marr was influenced by Ernst Haeckel, a professor who popularized the notion of Social Darwinism among Germany's educated classes.

Despite his influence, Marr's ideas were not immediately adopted by German nationalists. The Pan-German League, founded in 1891, originally allowed for the membership of Jews, provided they were fully assimilated into German culture. It was only in 1912, eight years after Marr's death, that the League declared racism as an underlying principle. Nevertheless, Marr was a major link in the evolving chain of German racism that erupted into genocide during the Nazi era.

Alleged late renunciation of antisemitism
According to Moshe Zimmermann in Wilhelm Marr: The Patriarch of Anti-Semitism, a book written 100 years after the fact, toward the end of his life Marr came to renounce anti-semitism, arguing that social upheaval in Germany had been the result of the Industrial Revolution and conflict between political movements. He "openly requested the Jews' pardon for having erred in isolating the problem". In Testament of an Antisemite supposedly attributed to Marr but not published until Zimmerman's book, Marr explained the history of his thinking, asserting that he had originally been a "philo-Semite", having rejected "the miserable Romantic madness of Germanism". He complained that modern anti-Semitism was becoming merged with German mysticism and nationalism. Marr condemned "the beer drinking leaders, the gay 'Heil' shouters of modern anti-Semitism" and crude prejudice against Jewish writers and thinkers.

Works
 Pillen. Eigens präpariert für deutsche und andere Michel, 1844
 Katechismus eines Republikaners der Zukunft, 1845
 Das junge Deutschland in der Schweiz. Ein Beitrag zur Geschichte der geheimen Verbindungen unserer Tage, 1846
 Anarchie oder Autorität? 1852
 Reise durch Central-Amerika, 1852
 Messias Lassalle und seine Hamburger Jünger. Eine Abfertigung, 1863
 Der Ausschluß Oesterreichs aus Deutschland ist eine politische Widersinnigkeit, 1866
 Selbständigkeit und Hoheitsrecht der freien Stadt Hamburg sind ein Anachronismus geworden, 1866
 Des Weltunterganges Posaunenstoß, lieblich begleitet und allen Gläubigen gewidment, 1867
 Es muß alles Soldat werden! oder die Zukunft des Norddeutschen Bundes. Ein Phantasiegemälde, 1867
 Nach Jerusalem mit dem Papst.Eine Bergpredigt, 1867
  Der Antichrist und das Ende der Welt, 1875
 Religiöse Streifzüge eines philosophischen Touristen, 1876
 Der Sieg des Judenthums über das Germanenthum – Vom nichtconfessionellen Standpunkt aus betrachtet. Bern: Rudolph Costenoble, 1879. - English translation: Rohringer, Gerhard. Victory of Judaism over Germanism - Considered from a Nonreligious Perspective. 2009
 Jeiteles teutonicus. Harfenklänge aus dem vermauschelten Deutschland von Marr dem Zweiten, 1879
 Vom jüdischen Kriegsschauplatz. Eine Streitschrift, 1879
  Das Salomonische Spruchbuch, 1879
 Wählet keinen Juden! Der Weg zum Siege des Germanenthums über das Judenthum. Ein Mahnwort an die Wähler nichtjüdischen Stammes aller Confessionen. Berlin: Hentze, 1880
 Der Judenkrieg, seine Fehler und wie er zu organisieren ist. 2. Theil von ""Der Sieg des Judenthums über das Germanenthum", 1880
 Goldene Ratten und rothe Mäuse, 1880
 Oeffnet die Augen, Ihr deutschen Zeitungsleser. Ein unentbehrliches Büchlein für jeden deutschen Zeitungsleser, 1880
 Lessing contra Sem. Allen "Rabbinern" der Juden- und Christenheit, allen Toleranz-Duselheimern aller Parteien, allen Pharisäern und "Schriftgelehrten" tolerantest gewidmet, 1885

See also 
 New antisemitism
 History of antisemitism

Notes

External links 
Der Sieg des Judenthums ueber das Germanenthum "The Victory of Jewry over Germandom" by Wilhelm Marr at archive.org

 Werner Bergmann, Wilhelm Marr’s A Mirror to the Jews, in: Key Documents of German-Jewish History, September 22, 2016.  

1819 births
1904 deaths
Politicians from Magdeburg
German anarchists
German male journalists
German political writers
German male writers
Members of the Hamburg Parliament